Xylosma  is a genus of flowering plants in the family Salicaceae. It contains around 100 species of evergreen shrubs and trees commonly known as brushhollies, xylosmas, or, more ambiguously, "logwoods". The generic name is derived from the Greek words ξύλον (xylon), meaning "wood", and ὀσμή (osmé), meaning "smell", referring to the fragrant wood of some of the species. The Takhtajan system places it in the family Flacourtiaceae, which is considered defunct by the Angiosperm Phylogeny Group.

Description
The fruit is a small purple-black berry  in diameter that contains 2 to 8 seeds.

Species
, Plants of the World Online accepted the following species:

Xylosma acunae Borhidi & O.Muñiz
Xylosma avilae Sleumer
Xylosma bahamensis (Britton) Standl. – Bahamas xylosma (The Bahamas)
Xylosma benthamii (Tul.) Triana & Planch.
Xylosma bernardiana Sleumer
Xylosma boliviana Sleumer
Xylosma boulindae Sleumer (New Caledonia)
Xylosma brachystachys Craib
Xylosma buxifolia A.Gray – boxleaf xylosma (the Caribbean)
Xylosma capillipes Guillaumin (New Caledonia)
Xylosma characantha Standl.
Xylosma chiapensis Lundell
Xylosma chlorantha Donn.Sm.
Xylosma ciliatifolia (Clos) Eichler
Xylosma cinerea (Clos) Hemsl.
Xylosma claraensis Urb.
Xylosma confusa Guillaumin
Xylosma congesta (Lour.) Merr. – shiny xylosma
Xylosma controversa Clos
Xylosma cordata (Kunth) Gilg
Xylosma coriacea (Poit.) Eichler
Xylosma crenata (H.St.John) H.St.John – sawtooth logwood (Kauai in Hawaii)
Xylosma domingensis (Urb.) M.H.Alford
Xylosma dothioensis Guillaumin
Xylosma elegans (Tul.) Triana & Planch.
Xylosma fawcettii Urb. (Jamaica)
Xylosma flexuosa (Kunth) Hemsl. – brushholly (Mexico, Central America)
Xylosma gigantifolia Sleumer
Xylosma glaberrima Sleumer (Brazil)
Xylosma glaucescens Urb.
Xylosma grossecrenata (Sleumer) Lescot (New Caledonia)
Xylosma guillauminii Sleumer
Xylosma hawaiensis Seem. – Hawaiian brushholly, maua (Hawaii)
Xylosma hispidula Standl.
Xylosma horrida Rose
Xylosma iberiensis J.E.Gut.
Xylosma inaequinervia Sleumer (New Caledonia)
Xylosma intermedia (Seem.) Triana & Planch.
Xylosma kaalaensis Sleumer (New Caledonia)
Xylosma lancifolia Sleumer
Xylosma lifuana Guillaumin
Xylosma lineolata Urb. & Ekman
Xylosma longifolia Clos (Western Himalayas)
Xylosma longipedicellata A.Pool
Xylosma longipetiolata Legname
Xylosma lucida (Tul.) Sleumer
Xylosma luzonensis Clos
Xylosma maidenii Sleumer
Xylosma martinicensis (Krug & Urb.) Urb.
Xylosma molesta Sleumer (New Caledonia)
Xylosma nelsonii Merr.
Xylosma nervosa Guillaumin
Xylosma nipensis Borhidi
Xylosma nitida (Hell.) A.Gray ex Griseb.
Xylosma obovata (Karsten) Triana & Planchon (Colombia)
Xylosma oligandra Donn.Sm.
Xylosma orbiculata (J.R.Forst. & G.Forst.) G.Forst. (Fiji, Tonga, Niue)
Xylosma ovata Benth.
Xylosma pachyphylla (Krug & Urb.) Urb. – spiny logwood (Puerto Rico)
Xylosma palawanensis Mend. (Philippines)
Xylosma panamensis Turcz.
Xylosma pancheri Guillaumin
Xylosma papuana Gilg
Xylosma parvifolia Jessup
Xylosma paucinervosa (Steyerm.) Sleumer
Xylosma peltata (Sleumer) Lescot (New Caledonia)
Xylosma pininsularis Guillaumin (New Caledonia)
Xylosma prockia (Turcz.) Turcz.
Xylosma prockia (Turcz.) Turcz.
Xylosma proctorii Sleumer (Jamaica)
Xylosma pseudosalzmannii Sleumer
Xylosma pubescens Griseb.
Xylosma quichensis Donn.Sm.
Xylosma raimondii Sleumer
Xylosma rhombifolia (Britton & P.Wilson) Sleumer
Xylosma roigiana Borhidi
Xylosma rubicunda (H.Karst.) Gilg
Xylosma ruiziana Sleumer (Peru)
Xylosma rusbyana Sleumer
Xylosma samoensis (Christoph.) Sleumer (Savai'i)
Xylosma sanctae-annae Sleumer
Xylosma schaefferioides A.Gray
Xylosma schaefferioides A.Gray – white logwood (Greater Antilles)
Xylosma schwaneckeana (Krug & Urb.) Urb. – Schwaneck's logwood (Puerto Rico)
Xylosma senticosa Hance
Xylosma serpentina Sleumer (New Caledonia)
Xylosma serrata (Sw.) Urb.
Xylosma shaferi (P.Wilson) R.A.Howard & W.R.Briggs
Xylosma simulans A.C.Sm.
Xylosma smithiana Fosberg
Xylosma spiculifera (Tul.) Triana & Planch. (Colombia)
Xylosma suaveolens (J.R.Forst. & G.Forst.) G.Forst.
Xylosma suluensis Merr.
Xylosma sumatrana Slooten
Xylosma terrae-reginae C.T.White & Sleumer (NSW and Queensland, Australia)
Xylosma tessmannii Sleumer
Xylosma tuberculata Sleumer (New Caledonia)
Xylosma tweediana (Clos) Eichler
Xylosma velutina (Tul.) Triana & Planch.
Xylosma venosa N.E.Br.
Xylosma vincentii Guillaumin

Distribution
The genus is predominantly native to the tropics and subtropics, from the Caribbean, Central America, northern South America, the Pacific Islands, southern Asia and northern Australasia. One species, X. congesta, is found in warm-temperate eastern Asia (China, Korea and Japan). Molecular phylogenetic analysis suggest that the genus Lasiochlamys from New Caledonia may be nested in Xylosma.

Ecology
Xylosma foliage is used as food by the caterpillars of some lepidoptera, such as the rustic (Cupha erymanthis), which feeds on X. congesta (syn. X. racemosa), and the common leopard (Phalanta phalantha), which feeds on X. longifolia and X. congesta.

Uses
The main use for the genus is as hedge and topiary plants among gardeners in desert and chaparral climates. Xylosma congesta is the species usually seen in garden hedges and in road landscaping, despite the fact it bears thorns. Other species cultivated for these purposes include X. bahamensis, X. flexuosa, and X. spiculifera (syn. X. heterophylla). X. longifolia is sometimes grown in India for its edible fruits. In addition, a medicinal extract is made from its young leaves that acts as antispasmodic, narcotic, and sedative. 15 species of the genus have reported medicinal or veterinary use.

References

 
Salicaceae genera
Taxa named by Georg Forster
Dioecious plants